Christopher Wolf (born Washington, DC 1954) is an American attorney known for his career in Internet and privacy law.  He was one of the first lawyers to practice Internet law and Privacy law.  He is  a retired  partner in the international law firm of Hogan Lovells US LLP. He is the founding editor and lead author of the first Practising Law Institute (PLI) legal treatise on privacy and information security law.  He is the founder and co-chair of a think tank devoted to emerging privacy issues, the Future of Privacy Forum. FPF serves as a catalyst for privacy leadership and scholarship, advancing principled data practices in support of emerging technologies.  He also has chaired an international consortium of non-governmental organizations fighting online hate speech, the International Network Against Cyber-hate (INACH).  Wolf graduated from Bowdoin College in 1976, and magna cum laude Order of the Coif from Washington & Lee University School of Law in 1980. He clerked with the Hon. Aubrey E. Robinson Jr., United States District Court, District of Columbia, 1980–1982.

In 2013, Wolf co-authored (with Abraham Foxman) a book entitled Viral Hate: Containing its Spread on the Internet (Macmillan Palgrave),reflecting his longstanding and ongoing work monitoring and addressing online hate.  

Wolf is known for his decades-long commitment through Board Service to various non-profits, focusing on social services, civil rights and the arts.

Interests
He is chairman emeritus of the International Network Against Cyber-Hate (INACH) and chaired the Anti-Defamation League's National Committee on the Internet. He serves on the national board of the Anti-Defamation League was regional chair of the Washington, DC ADL Board (1998–2002).  He received the ADL Lifetime Achievement Award in 2018.  He is on the Boards of the Electronic Privacy Information Center, the DC History Center, the Capital Jewish Museum and Young Concert Artists.  He was on the National Symphony Orchestra Board of Directors, and the Board of Directors of Food & Friends, where he was Board President (1996–1998).  He also served on the Boards of WETA Radio and Television, and the George Washington University Hospital.   Wolf was the first president of Responsible Electronic Communication Alliance (RECA), an organization started to promote professional standards for online communication and marketing.  Wolf was made a member of the American Law Institute in 2012.  He has been a member of the Cosmos Club in Washington, DC since 1997.

References

Anti-Defamation League members
Bowdoin College alumni
Living people
Lawyers from Washington, D.C.
1954 births
Washington and Lee University School of Law alumni
Date of birth missing (living people)
People associated with Hogan Lovells